Russell Mawhinney (born 28 March 1960) is a New Zealand former cricketer. He played first-class cricket for Otago, Griqualand West and Northern Districts between 1983 and 1991.

See also
 List of Otago representative cricketers

References

External links
 

1960 births
Living people
New Zealand cricketers
Otago cricketers
Griqualand West cricketers
Northern Districts cricketers
People from Ranfurly, New Zealand